Dana Rožlapa (born 16 November 1979) is a Latvian racing cyclist. She rode at the UCI Road World Championships in 2014, 2020 and 2021, and is a seven-time winner of the Latvian National Time Trial Championships.

Major results
Source: 

2012
 1st  Time trial, National Road Championships
2013
 1st  Time trial, National Road Championships
2014
 1st  Time trial, National Road Championships
2015
 1st Time trial, East Flanders Provincial Road Championships
 2nd Road race, National Road Championships
2019
 National Road Championships
1st  Time trial
2nd Road race
2020
 1st  Time trial, National Road Championships
2021
 National Road Championships
1st  Time trial
2nd Road race
2022
 National Road Championships
1st  Time trial
2nd Road race
 8th Chrono des Nations

References

External links

1979 births
Living people
Latvian female cyclists
People from Talsi
Cyclists at the 2015 European Games
European Games competitors for Latvia